Jacio Marcos de Jesus (born July 30, 1989 in São Paulo), known as Jacio Marcos or Jacio de Jesus or simply Jacio, is a Brazilian footballer who plays for Penapolense as midfielder.

Career statistics

References

External links

1989 births
Living people
Brazilian footballers
Brazilian expatriate footballers
Expatriate footballers in South Korea
Association football midfielders
Operário Ferroviário Esporte Clube players
Busan IPark players
Paraná Clube players
Capivariano Futebol Clube players
Clube Atlético Penapolense players
K League 1 players
Campeonato Brasileiro Série B players
Brazilian expatriate sportspeople in South Korea
Footballers from São Paulo